Peter Henry Bairnsfather-Cloete (5 March 1917 – 19 December 1942) was a South African first-class cricketer and South African Army officer.

The son of Hugh Cloete and Nicolette Bairnsfather, he was born at Cape Town in March 1917. He was educated at the Western Province Prep, before attending the Diocesan College. Bairnsfather-Cloete made his debut in first-class cricket for Western Province against Griqualand West in December 1936 at Cape Town in the Currie Cup. He made eight further first-class appearances for Western Province to March 1940. He scored 74 runs in his nine first-class matches, at an average of 7.40. With his right-arm slow bowling, he took 29 wickets at a bowling average of 33.41; his best bowling figures of 5 for 112 came against Orange Free State in February 1937. 

Aside from playing cricket, Bairnsfather-Cloete owned the luxury Alphen Hotel in Constantia, Cape Town. He served in the Second World War as a captain in the Duke of Edinburgh's Own Rifles. During the war he was attached to the headquarters of the 1st South African Division, which was taking part in the North African campaign. Bairnsfather-Cloete died on 19 December 1942 when the Lockheed Loadstar he was a passenger aboard crashed into Lake Victoria shortly after take-off from Kisumu Airport in Kenya Colony; he had been returning to South Africa from Cairo.

References

External links

1917 births
1942 deaths
Cricketers from Cape Town
Alumni of Diocesan College, Cape Town
South African cricketers
Western Province cricketers
South African hoteliers
South African military personnel of World War II
Victims of aviation accidents or incidents in 1942
Victims of aviation accidents or incidents in Kenya
South African military personnel killed in World War II